Ellmont is a ghost town site near Brockway, in the Elk County−Jefferson County areas of western Pennsylvania.

It is located along a present-day bicycle and hiking rail trail, built on the old railroad right of way along Little Toby Creek in Jefferson and Elk Counties.

History
A steel mill was built nearby in 1883, leading to the establishment of the town of Blue Rock, later renamed Ellmont.

After the mill burned down, the town was abandoned.

References

Ghost towns in Pennsylvania
Elk County, Pennsylvania
Jefferson County, Pennsylvania